Talbott is an unincorporated community in  Hamblen and Jefferson counties in the U.S. state of Tennessee. The community is located on US Route 11E between Morristown and Jefferson City.

In 2020, the planning commission of the city of Morristown had annexed a section of Talbott along U.S. Route 11E into its city limits.

Education
Talbott Elementary School is located in the Jefferson County portion. Alpha Elementary serves students in the Hamblen County portion of the community.

References

Unincorporated communities in Tennessee
Unincorporated communities in Jefferson County, Tennessee
Morristown metropolitan area, Tennessee